Ust-Kishert is a rural locality (a selo) and the administrative center of Kishertsky District of Perm Krai, Russia. Population:

References

Rural localities in Kishertsky District
Kungursky Uyezd